Symptosuchus is an extinct genus of goniopholidid mesoeucrocodylian. It is known from the Late Cretaceous of Argentina. Argentine paleontologist Florentino Ameghino named the genus in 1899, along with the type species S. contortidens. It was formally described by Carlos Rusconi in 1934.

References

Late Cretaceous crocodylomorphs of South America
Prehistoric pseudosuchian genera